Megan Stalter (born 1990) is an American comedian and actress. In her videos, Stalter specializes in desperate, deluded characters who are prone to theatricality, frequent mispronunciations, and botched suicide attempts. "I feel like all my characters are people whose lives didn't turn out a certain way, but they're still trying to pretend like it did," Stalter has said. In 2019, she joined the cast and writing staff of the reboot of The National Lampoon Radio Hour. She is also the host of the webseries The Megan Stalter Show and the Forever Dog podcast Confronting Demons with Megan Stalter.

Early life
Stalter was born in Cleveland, where she lived until the age of 12. She then moved around with her family, and lived in Dayton, Huber Heights and Centerville, Ohio. She was raised in the Pentecostal Church.  Stalter attended Wayne High School, where she was part of the drama club, and tried out for every play, but never got the lead. After graduating from high school, Stalter attended Sinclair Community College and later Wright State University, but left to try acting again. She began doing sketch and improvisational comedy in Dayton and moved to Chicago soon after to do comedy full time. Stalter often collaborates with her brother Nick and his wife Destiny.

Career
In 2019, Stalter moved to New York and got a manager. New York magazine named Stalter one of the "comedians you should and will know in 2019," and in 2020 The New York Times critic Jason Zinoman declared her "sketch comedy's newest star," writing, "In the constantly shifting ecosystem of young performers on Twitter and Instagram, the most vital voice to emerge during this anxious, isolating moment is that of Meg Stalter."

She is the voice of Bonnie Davis in the Paramount+ original series Tooning Out the News and plays Kayla in the HBO Max comedy Hacks.

Personal life
Stalter lives in Los Angeles. She is  bisexual.

As of October 2022, Stalter is currently dating a woman named Maddie.

Credits

Film

Television

References

External links
Megan Stalter on IMDb
Megan Stalter on Twitter
Megan Stalter on Instagram

1990 births
21st-century American comedians
21st-century American women
American bisexual actors
American sketch comedians
American stand-up comedians
American television actresses
American women comedians
Bisexual actresses
Bisexual comedians
Comedians from Ohio
LGBT people from Ohio
Living people
People from Cleveland
American LGBT comedians